Bill Mazeroski's 1960 World Series home run was a baseball play that occurred in Game 7 of the 1960 World Series on October 13, 1960, at Forbes Field in Pittsburgh, Pennsylvania. Leading off the bottom of ninth, in a 9–9 tie and with the count one ball, zero strikes, Mazeroski hit a line drive toward deep left field that cleared the wall for a solo home run. Mazeroski homered off of New York Yankees pitcher Ralph Terry to end the Series, giving the Pirates a 10–9 win and their first championship since 1925. It is the only Game 7 walk-off home run in World Series history.

Background
On the heels of a subpar season for Mazeroski and his fourth-place team, the 1960 campaign exceeded the wildest dreams of Pittsburgh sports fans. The Battlin' Bucs as they would become known dominated the National League virtually from the start to claim their first pennant since the 1927 season. Meanwhile, Mazeroski was an NL starter in both All-Star Games.

The Pirates seized control of the pennant race in August, when they won 21 of 31 games with Mazeroski in a lead role. He hit .373, drove in 16 runs and had a 26-game errorless streak in the month. The 95-59 Pirates finished seven games ahead of second place Milwaukee for the NL pennant. The team was rewarded with a trip to the 1960 World Series, where the second baseman forged his legacy against the New York Yankees with a pair of game-winning home runs. The 1960 Pirates team featured eight All-Stars, but was widely predicted to lose the World Series to a powerful New York Yankees team.

Before their 1960 season, the Yankees made one such trade with the Kansas City Athletics in which they acquired outfielder Roger Maris. In his first Yankees season, Maris hit a single, double, and two home runs in his first game as a Yankee. He was named to the AL All-Star roster again and played in both games. He finished the season leading the AL in slugging percentage (.581), runs batted in (112), and extra base hits (64). He also hit 39 home runs and had a .283 batting average. He won the American League's Most Valuable Player award and was recognized as an outstanding defensive outfielder with a Gold Glove Award. The Yankees won the American League pennant, the first of five consecutive pennants

The New York Yankees headed into the World Series with a 15-game winning streak, the 8th longest streak in the American League this century, after Dale Long's two-run 9th-inning home run gives them an 8–7 win over the Boston Red Sox. The 193 home runs are an AL season record, three better than the 1956 Yankees. RBI leader Roger Maris drove in three runs, but fell one home run short of Mickey Mantle's league-high 40.

The 1960 Yankees won the AL pennant for the 10th time in 12 years under Casey Stengel, and outscored the Pirates 55–27 in the seven World Series games.

Postseason 
Yankees manager Casey Stengel picked Art Ditmar, who had won the most games, 15, for the Yankees, rather than the established star, Whitey Ford. The Pirates knocked Ditmar out of the box in the first inning. In a portent of things to come, Bill Mazeroski's two-run 5th-inning home run off Jim Coates was the difference as Pittsburgh beat the Yankees 6–4 in its first World Series win since 1925. Roy Face survived a two-run 9th-inning Elston Howard home run to preserve Vern Law's victory.

In Game 2, Mickey Mantle hit two home runs in a Yankees 16–3 victory at Forbes Field, evening the World Series. A seven-run 6th inning overwhelmed Pittsburgh.

At Yankee Stadium for Game 3, Bobby Richardson collected six RBI, including a grand slam off reliever Clem Labine in a six-run first inning, and Whitey Ford pitched a four-hitter 10–0 shutout to give the Yankees a 2–1 World Series lead, spoiling Pittsburgh manager Danny Murtaugh's 43rd birthday.

Vern Law won again in Game 4, thanks to his own RBI single and Bill Virdon's two-run hit. Roy Face retired the final eight batters in order. The Pittsburgh Pirates' 3–2 win evened the 1960 World Series.

In Game 5, Bill Mazeroski starred again. His two-run double to left field off Art Ditmar scored Don Hoak and Gino Cimoli. This staked Harvey Haddix to a 3–0 lead in the fourth inning. Roy Face was called on once more for another hitless effort to preserve a 5–2 win over the Yankees and 3–2 World Series lead for the surprising Pirates.

In Game 6, Whitey Ford preserved the Yankees' hopes with a seven-hit shutout at Forbes Field. Bob Friend was bombed again as the Yankees coast 12–0. Bobby Richardson's two run-scoring triples gave him a World Series record of 12 RBI. Of Pittsburgh's three losses, Friend was on the hook for two, racking up a 13.50 ERA over his three appearances.

The Yankees outscored Pittsburgh 55–27, and administered three thrashings (16–3, 10–0 and 12–0), but the resilient Pirates took the other four contests by a run differential of only +7 (6–4, 3–2, 5–2 and 10–9).

The setup

World Series Game 7

The drama of Mazeroski's home run was heightened by the excitement that preceded the home run: A combined total of seven runs were scored by both teams in a wild and whacky bottom of the eighth and top of the ninth. An oddity in this game – it is the only World Series game this century with no strikeouts recorded. Dick Groat had an RBI single and scored in the eighth inning, in which the Pirates scored five runs to take a 9–7 lead.

Gil McDougald entered the game as a pinch runner in the top of the ninth, he scored on Yogi Berra's ground ball to tie the game at 9–9.

After winning Game 5 as a starter, Harvey Haddix relieved late in Game 7 and was credited with the win when Mazeroski hit his Series-ending famous walk-off home run. Haddix went 2–0 in the 1960 Series, with a 2.45 ERA.

The infield developed a "rock-hard" surface throughout the Forbes Field's history. During the final game of the 1960 World Series, Yankees shortstop Tony Kubek was struck in the neck with a ball that bounced off the hard dirt surface. This broke up a potentially rally-killing double play and caused Kubek to exit the game during the eighth inning. Bill Virdon ultimately reached first base on the infield single. This started a rally for the Pirates.

Pirates' catcher Hal Smith helped set the stage for Mazeroski's dramatic home run one inning earlier, when he capped off a Pirates rally with a pivotal three-run home run of his own. Smith's home run put the Pirates ahead 9–7, but its true value was realized when the Yankees scored two runs in the top of the ninth inning to tie the score. Thus, instead of Mazeroski coming to bat in the bottom of the ninth with the score 9–6 in favor of the Yankees, the game was tied with the winning run (in the form of Mazeroski) at the plate.

The play
One of the greatest games in baseball history got wilder yet in the top of the ninth inning, when the Yankees plated two runs to forge a 9-9 deadlock. At that point, Mazeroski admittedly got caught up in the sudden turn of events. It seemed the second baseman had forgotten that he was to lead off the bottom half of the inning, and it wasn't until first base coach Lenny Levy reminded him that he hurriedly picked up a bat.

Johnny Blanchard was the catcher who called the pitch. At precisely 3:36 p.m. local time, on a 1-0 count, Mazeroski slammed Terry's high fastball just to the left of the 406-foot marker in distant left-center field.  The drama of Mazeroski's home run was heightened by the excitement that preceded the home run: seven runs were scored by both teams in a wild and wacky bottom of the eighth and top of the ninth.  An oddity in this game – it is the only World Series game with no strikeouts recorded. Another oddity, this one to the 1960 World Series itself – Mazeroski's home run makes this 1960 World Series the only World Series in major league history won by a home run in the bottom of the ninth inning of the seventh and deciding game.  Despite Mazeroski's heroics, however, Bobby Richardson is named the Series MVP, as the Yankees outscore Pittsburgh, 55 to 27.

At that point, Mazeroski finished his sprint around the bases like a giddy schoolboy before he was mobbed at home plate. "You know, all I could think about was, "We beat the Yankeesǃ We beat themǃ We beat the damn Yankeesǃ" he said.

Fourteen-year-old schoolboy Andy Jerpe retrieved the ball amid the cherry trees in Schenley Park, which was adjacent to the ballpark. Mazeroski signed the ball for him in the clubhouse, but the keepsake was lost during a neighborhood game a short time later.
 
Even though Mazeroski hit .320 with team highs of five RBI, four runs scored and two home runs, Yankees counterpart Bobby Richardson was selected the Most Valuable Player of the series. Coincidentally, Mazeroski, who wore #9 for the Pirates, came to bat in the bottom of the 9th inning with the score tied 9-9.

The calls

Chuck Thompson is particularly remembered for his flawed but endearing call of Bill Mazeroski's championship-clinching home run to end the 1960 World Series, for which he was the play-by-play announcer for NBC Radio.(Audio) This event was replayed in full on an MLB radio special some years ago, during one of the players' strikes. The pitcher was actually Ralph Terry; Art Ditmar was warming up in the bullpen, and besides that error as well as relaying the final score incorrectly at first, Thompson just got caught up in the moment:
Well, a little while ago, when we mentioned that this one, in typical fashion, was going right to the wire, little did we know…Art Ditmar throws—here's a swing and a high fly ball going deep to left, this may do it!…Back to the wall goes Berra, it is…over the fence, home run, the Pirates win!…(long pause for crowd noise)…Ladies and gentlemen, Mazeroski has hit a one-nothing pitch over the left field fence at Forbes Field to win the 1960 World Series for the Pittsburgh Pirates by a score of ten to nothing!…Once again, that final score…The Pittsburgh Pirates, the 1960 world champions, defeat the New York Yankees. The Pirates ten, and the Yankees NINE!... and Forbes Field... is an insane asylum!

In 1985, Thompson's Ditmar-Terry flub became a commercial hit, featured as an audio-over in a nostalgia-immersed Budweiser TV ad during that year's World Series. A libel lawsuit subsequently filed by Ditmar against Anheuser-Busch and its advertising agency for the commercial was ultimately rejected by a United States District Court.

Aftermath
The 1960 Pirates were the only team between 1945 and 2001 to have not succumbed to the so-called "Ex-Cubs Factor" in the postseason. They also became the first team to win a World Series on a home run, a feat later achieved by the Toronto Blue Jays in 1993, although Joe Carter's home run came in Game 6 of the 1993 Series. Mazeroski's homer remains the only walk-off home run in Game 7 of a World Series.

After Forbes Field was demolished, the section of the left-field wall where the home run left the park was moved to the Pirates' new home of Three Rivers Stadium, and still later was moved to their current home, PNC Park. A line of bricks marks that section of the wall, next to a preserved wall section, and a plaque indicating the spot where Mazeroski's homer left the park is embedded in the current sidewalk.

The portion of the left field wall over which Bill Mazeroski hit his walk-off home run to end the 1960 World Series, between the scoreboard and the "406 FT" sign, no longer stands at its original location. A portion of that wall, including the distance marker, had been sliced off and moved to the Allegheny Club at Three Rivers Stadium. Before the Three Rivers demolition, the section of the wall was salvaged, and in 2009 it was restored and placed on the Riverwalk outside of PNC Park.

Meanwhile, the original location of that wall is outlined by bricks extending from the left-center field wall across Roberto Clemente Drive and into the sidewalk. A plaque embedded in the sidewalk marks the spot where Mazeroski's home run cleared the wall. The left-center and center field brick wall with "457 FT" and "436 FT" painted on it still stands at its original location, along with the stadium's flagpole, adjacent to the University of Pittsburgh's Mervis and Posvar Halls. Despite not technically being the correct section of wall where Mazeroski's famous home run cleared, it is often locally referred to as "Mazeroski's Wall." This portion of the wall remained after Forbes Field was torn down, and was refurbished in 2006 in time for the All-Star Game hosted in Pittsburgh. In addition, a wooden replica of an entrance to the stadium, including a ticket window and players entrance, was constructed and placed near the remaining wall in 2006. The home plate used in the stadium's final game remains preserved in the University of Pittsburgh's Posvar Hall. However, its location has been altered; author John McCollister wrote, "Had architects placed home plate in its precise spot about half of the Pirates fans could not view it. The reason: it would have to be on display in the fifth stall of the ladies' restroom."

A ceremony is held each October 13 at the outfield wall in Oakland to listen to a taped broadcast of the final game of the 1960 World Series. The tradition was started by Squirrel Hill resident Saul Finkelstein, who at 1:05 pm on October 13, 1985, sat alone at the base of the flagpole and listened to the NBC radio broadcast of Chuck Thompson and Jack Quinlan. Finkelstein continued the tradition for eight more years, until word spread and other people began attending in 1993. On October 13, 2000—the game's 40th anniversary—over 600 people attended to listen to the broadcast, including Mazeroski himself. For the 50th anniversary, on October 13, 2010, a plaque honoring Mazeroski was dedicated and more than 1,000 attended the broadcast, including Mazeroski and several other former Pirates.

In September 2010, a statue of Mazeroski was unveiled outside PNC Park, depicting his legendary home run celebration — a runner pose with both arms extended, ball cap in right hand.

See also
Joe Carter's 1993 World Series home run

References

External links
The Most Dramatic Home Run in World Series History
50 Years Ago Today, Bill Mazeroski Shocked The World
Bill Mazeroski's home run ball - MLB.com
Remembering Bill Mazeroski's 406ft Home Run 60 Years Later

World Series games
Pittsburgh Pirates postseason
New York Yankees postseason
1960 Major League Baseball season
Historic baseball plays
October 1960 sports events in the United States
1960 in sports in Pennsylvania
Baseball competitions in Pittsburgh